Cardonia is an unincorporated community in Van Buren Township, Clay County, Indiana. It is part of the Terre Haute Metropolitan Statistical Area.

History
Cardonia was founded in the year 1871 as a coal mining town. It was named for John F. Card, a mining official. A post office was established in Cardonia in 1879, and remained in operation until it was discontinued in 1909.

Geography

References

Unincorporated communities in Clay County, Indiana
Unincorporated communities in Indiana
Terre Haute metropolitan area